Jan-Roar Fagerli (born September 22, 1966 in Trondheim, Norway) is a former Norwegian ice hockey player. He played for the Norwegian national ice hockey team at the 1992 and 1994 Winter Olympics.

References

1966 births
Living people
Ice hockey players at the 1992 Winter Olympics
Ice hockey players at the 1994 Winter Olympics
Norwegian ice hockey players
Olympic ice hockey players of Norway
Sportspeople from Trondheim